

Timeline

Paleontology
Paleontology timelines